Chah Gach-e Sofla (also Romanized as Chāh Gach-e Soflá; also known as Chāh Gachī) is a village in Mishan Rural District, Mahvarmilani District, Mamasani County, Fars Province, Iran. At the 2006 census, its population was 116, in 25 families.

References 

Populated places in Mamasani County